Established in 1988, the Consortium of Humanities Centers and Institutes serves as a site for the discussion of issues germane to the fostering of cross-disciplinary activity and as a network for the circulation of information and the sharing of resources within the humanities and interpretive social sciences. CHCI has a membership of over 200 centers and institutes that are remarkably diverse in size and scope and are located in the United States, Australia, Canada, China, Korea, Finland, Taiwan, Ireland, United Kingdom, and other countries.

Mission and History
Established in 1988, the Consortium of Humanities Centers and Institutes (CHCI) serves as an arena for the discussion of issues germane to cross-disciplinary activity in the humanities and as a network for the circulation of information and best practices related to the organizational and management dimensions of humanities centers and institutes. CHCI produces a major Annual Meeting of its membership, maintains a content-rich website, produces an annual print directory, and serves as a re-circulator for information about its members via listservs and its website. Members of the Consortium also assist one another with ideas, evaluation, and other forms of service. The organization is headed by a President, and is governed by an International Advisory Board of member directors and other leaders in the humanities.

CHCI was established in 1988 as the product of two meetings: The Institutional Impact of Institutes at the University of California Humanities Research Institute (UCHRI, now based at the University of California, Irvine), convened by Murray Krieger, and an organizational meeting at the 1988 meeting of the American Council of Learned Societies (ACLS), convened by E. Ann Kaplan of the Humanities Institute at Stony Brook University. These gatherings were the first moments at which directors of humanities research organizations had come together to discuss issues of mutual concern, and the major product of the meetings was a unanimous sense that it was essential to establish a consortium to continue these dialogues. Ralph Cohen of the University of Virginia served from 1988-1995 as the organization's first Chair, while CHCI administration was based at UCHRI. In its early years, the CHCI membership included over 70 members from the US and four other countries.

In 1995 CHCI operations and leadership moved to the Center for 21st Century Studies at the University of Wisconsin–Milwaukee, at that time directed by Kathleen Woodward, currently Director of The Walter Chapin Simpson Center for the Humanities at the University of Washington. During CHCI's term at UW-Milwaukee, the membership grew to over 125 organizations as new centers were opened and existing members began to expand their programs and operations. This period of time also saw the dramatic expansion of CHCI's Annual Meetings, the development of the organization's first website, and two major grants from the Rockefeller Foundation for organizational development and network-building.

In 2001 CHCI moved to the auspices of the Humanities Center at Harvard, where Director Marjorie Garber served a six-year term as President of CHCI. During Professor Garber's term, membership continued to grow, and CHCI's annual meetings grew markedly in terms of depth, scale and impact.

In 2007, CHCI operations moved to the John Hope Franklin Humanities Institute at Duke University, under the leadership of ex-CHCI President Srinivas Aravamudan. At Duke, CHCI began developing new programs for membership, such as a partnership with the American Council of Learned Societies.

In 2016, CHCI moved from Duke University to the Center for the Humanities at the University of Wisconsin-Madison, where Professor Sara Guyer took over as president. In December of the same year, The Andrew W. Mellon Foundation announced their decision to fund two new CHCI initiatives: The CHCI Global Humanities Institutes and The CHCI Africa Initiative. On January 5, 2018 it was announced that CHCI would serve as a host organization for the American Council of Learned Societies's Public Fellows program.

CHCI is an affiliate member of the American Council of Learned Societies. The organization has put out statements affirming its support of federal funding for the humanities in general and for the National Endowment for the Humanities in particular.

Annual Meetings
CHCI's Annual Meetings provide an opportunity for member directors and administrators to engage in stimulating intellectual dialogues about broadly defined, current issues in the humanities. Each Annual Meeting includes useful and lively workshops focused on management issues, programming ideas and structures, fundraising, facilities, staffing, and other operational challenges facing member directors and their staffs. Perhaps most importantly, each CHCI Annual Meeting provides invaluable opportunities to meet, network, and collaborate with peers and counterparts at humanities centers and institutes from around the world. Each CHCI Annual Meeting is each constructed around a broadly defined intellectual theme, and is hosted by a member center or institute. Upcoming and recent Annual Meetings include:

Recent CHCI Annual Meetings

Humanities Informatics 
June 13–17, 2018
Institute of the Humanities and Global Cultures, University of Virginia

The Humanities Improvised 
August 10–13, 2017
Centre for Humanities Research, University of the Western Cape

Area Studies in a Globalizing World: Past, Present, and Future 
June 28 - July 1, 2016
School of Advanced Study, University of London

Humanities by the Numbers
June 5–7, 2015
Center for the Humanities, University of Wisconsin-Madison

Performative Humanities 
June 5–8, 2014
Research Institute for the Humanities, The Chinese University of Hong Kong

Humanities, Publics, and the State 
April 25–27, 2013
Hall Center for the Humanities, University of Kansas

Anthropocene Humanities 
June 13–16, 2012
Humanities Research Centre, Australian National University

Cities Humanities Archives
June 12–15, 2011
Jackman Humanities Institute, University of Toronto

Whose Global Humanities? 
June 14–15, 2010
Cogut Center for the Humanities, Brown University

Dialogues of Enlightenment 
June 11–13, 2009
The Institute for Advanced Research in the Humanities, University of Edinburgh

The Humanities in an Age of Science 
March 14–15, 2008
The Center for the Humanities, Washington University in St. Louis

Regional Logics 
April 2007
The Huntington Library, Art Collections, and Botanic Gardens

The Fate of Disciplines 
April 28–29, 2006
Franke Institute for the Humanities, University of Chicago

Open to the Public? 
June 17–18, 2005
Research Institute for Culture and History, Utrecht University

After the Past 
April 16–17, 2004
Stanford Humanities Center, Stanford University

International Advisory Board
 Sara Guyer, President of the Consortium; Director, Center for the Humanities, University of Wisconsin–Madison
 Jean Allman, Director, Center for the Humanities, Washington University in St. Louis
 Amanda Anderson, Director, Cogut Center for the Humanities, Brown University
 Ian Baucom, Director, John Hope Franklin Humanities Institute, Duke University
 Homi K. Bhabha, Director, Mahindra Humanities Center, Harvard University
 Rosi Braidotti, Director, Centre for the Humanities, Utrecht University
 Judith Buchanan, Director, Humanities Research Centre, University of York
Alan K. Chan, Dean, College of Humanities, Arts and Social Sciences, Nanyang Technological University
 James Chandler, Director, Franke Institute for the Humanities, University of Chicago
 Javier Durán, Director, Confluencenter for Creative Inquiry, University of Arizona
 Debjani Ganguly, Director, Institute of the Humanities and Global Cultures, University of Virginia
 Elizabeth Giorgis, Director, Modern Art Museum: Gebre Kristos Desta Center, Addis Ababa University
 Simon Goldhill, Director, Centre for Research in the Arts, Social Sciences and Humanities (CRASSH), University of Cambridge
 Hsiung Ping-ChenSimon Goldhill, Director, Research Institute for the Humanities, The Chinese University of Hong Kong
 Ranjana Khanna, Director, Franklin Humanities Institute, Duke University
 Premesh Lalu, Director, Centre of Humanities Research, University of the Western Cape
 Jie-Hyun Lim, Director, Critical Global Studies Institute, Sogang University
 Joyce C.H. Liu, Director, International Institute for Cultural Studies, National Chiao Tiung University
 Lydia Liu, Director, Institute for Comparative Literature and Society, Columbia University
 Helmut Muller-Sievers, Director, Center for the Humanities and the Arts, University of Colorado at Boulder
 Kerill O'Neill, Director, Center for the Arts and Humanities, Colby College
 Juan Obarrio, Director, Programa Sur Global, Universidad de San Martin; Johns Hopkins University
 Jane Ohlmeyer, Director, Trinity Long Room Hub, Trinity College, Dublin
 Robert Phiddian, Founding Director, Flinders Institute for Research in the Humanities, Flinders University
 Shalini Randeria, Rector, Institute for Human Sciences (IWM);, Director, Albert Hirschman Center on Democracy, Graduate Institute of International and Development Studies
 Gary Tomlinson, Director, Whitney Humanities Center, Yale University
 Bin Wong, Director, UCLA Asia Institute, University of California at Los Angeles
 Kathleen Woodward, Director, [http://depts.washington.edu/uwch/ Walter Chapin Simpson Center for the Humanities, University of Washington, Seattle

References

 CHCI
 http://www.chrflagship.uwc.ac.za/portfolio-item/chci-meeting-documentary/Searchable CHCI Member Directory
 CHCI Advisory Board
 Franklin Humanities Institute, Duke University

Links to Selected CHCI Members, Partners, and Affiliates

http://www.chrflagship.uwc.ac.za/
 The Folger Shakespeare Library
 American Council of Learned Societies
 Franke Institute for the Humanities, University of Chicago
 Franklin Humanities Institute, Duke University
 Hall Center for the Humanities at the University of Kansas
 Humanities Center at Harvard
 Humanities Institute at the University of Texas at Austin
 Humanities Institute of Ireland
 Humanities Research Centre at the Australian National University
 Huntington Library
 The Illinois Program for Research in the Humanities
 The Newberry Library
 centerNet
 Institute for Advanced Study at University of Minnesota

Humanities organizations
Member organizations of the American Council of Learned Societies